The 1974 FIBA Intercontinental Cup William Jones was the 8th edition of the FIBA Intercontinental Cup for men's basketball clubs. It took place at Mexico City, Mexico.

Participants

League stage
Day 1, September 10 1974

|}

Day 2, September 11 1974

|}

Day 3, September 12 1974

|}

Day 4, September 13, 1974

|}

Day 5, September 14, 1974

|}

Final standings

External links
 1974 Intercontinental Cup William Jones

1974
1974–75 in American basketball
1974–75 in South American basketball
1974–75 in European basketball
1974 in Mexican sports
International basketball competitions hosted by Mexico